Abhishek Reddy (born 14 September 1994) is an Indian first-class cricketer who plays for Andhra.

References

External links
 

1994 births
Living people
Indian cricketers
Karnataka cricketers
People from Bidar
Cricketers from Karnataka